Rennier Gadabu is a Nauruan politician elected to the Parliament of Nauru during the 2019 elections held on August 24, 2019. He represents the Aiwo Constituency and was elected with 368 votes. Following his election to Parliament, Mr. Gadabu was appointed by newly elected President Lionel Aingimea to serve in his administration as Minister for Commerce, Industry & Environment; Climate Change; and Infrastructure Development on 28 August 2019.  

He is a graduate of the University of the South Pacific. He previously served as First Secretary at the Permanent Mission of the Republic of Nauru to the United Nations in New York.

References

External links 

 Photo by IISD/ENB | Kiara Worth

Year of birth missing (living people)
Living people
Members of the Parliament of Nauru
University of the South Pacific alumni
Nauruan diplomats
21st-century Nauruan politicians